Phil Knight, Philip Knight, or Phillip Knight may refer to:

Phil Knight (born 1938), American businessman, co-founder of Nike, Inc.
Philip Knight (cricketer), (1835-1882), English cricketer
Phillip Knight (footballer), Australian footballer